Sead Sušić (born 3 January 1953) is a Bosnian former football player who played for Red Star Belgrade, among other teams. He also earned one cap for Yugoslavia against Spain's national team, in 1978.

Club career
Sušić arrived to Red Star Belgrade in 1971 as a talented 18-year-old where he played under head coach Miljan Miljanić.

International career
He made one appearance for Yugoslavia, in a November 1977 World Cup qualification match against Spain.

Post-playing
After retiring from playing, Sušić began living in Sarajevo. During the late 1980s and early 1990s, he ran a restaurant named Stari krovovi in the Sarajevo neighbourhood of Kovačići.

In the 1990s, Sušić made Liège his primary residence where he has been working as a FIFA-licensed players' agent.

Personal life
Sušić's son is Tino-Sven Sušić. Safet Sušić is his younger brother. Sušić's mother Paša died at age 96 in April 2018.

References

External links

Profile at Serbian federation
NASL stats

1953 births
Living people
People from Zavidovići
Bosniaks of Bosnia and Herzegovina
Association football forwards
Yugoslav footballers
Yugoslavia international footballers
Red Star Belgrade footballers
Colorado Caribous players
Toronto Blizzard (1971–1984) players
RFC Liège players
R.W.D. Molenbeek players
Yugoslav First League players
North American Soccer League (1968–1984) players
Belgian Pro League players
Yugoslav expatriate footballers
Expatriate soccer players in the United States
Yugoslav expatriate sportspeople in the United States
Expatriate soccer players in Canada
Yugoslav expatriate sportspeople in Canada
Expatriate footballers in Belgium
Yugoslav expatriate sportspeople in Belgium
Association football agents